Pompion (pronounced "punkin") Hill Chapel is small "back parish" church near Huger, South Carolina.  Built in 1763, it is a virtually unaltered example of a brick Georgian parish church, retaining interior and exterior finishes.  It was declared a National Historic Landmark in 1970.

Description and history

The Pompion Hill Chapel is located in a rural area, overlooking the Cooper River a few miles southwest of the hamlet of Huger. The brick is laid in Flemish bond, and the roof is original slate. It has matching entrances on the long sides, at the center of the five-bay facades. The doors and windows are all set in openings with rounded arch tops, the windows topped by fanlights. A small chancel area projects from the building's eastern end, topped by a gable roof, and with a Palladian window in its eastern wall. It is built in Georgian style.

The interior has a brick floor, laid in a herringbone pattern, with crossing aisles laid in red tile placed diagonally.  The walls are plaster, rising to a cove ceiling.  The interior woodwork and furnishings, including pews and pulpit are all original.  The only significant alteration to the building is the reconstruction of the vestry at its western end, which was done using the original bricks.

The chapel was built in 1763-65, and was the second church to stand on the site.  When the Province of South Carolina became officially Anglican (Episcopalian) in 1706, the church built here was the seat of St. Thomas' Parish, one of nine into which the province was divided.  This church replaced the original wooden church, and was built by mason William Axson, with bricks provided by Zachariah Villepontoux from the nearby Parnassus Plantation.

See also
List of National Historic Landmarks in South Carolina
National Register of Historic Places listings in Berkeley County, South Carolina

References

External links

Pompion Hill Chapel, Berkeley County (near jct. of S.C. Hwys. 41 & 402, Huger), with 8 photos, at South Carolina Department of Archives and History

National Historic Landmarks in South Carolina
Churches in Berkeley County, South Carolina
Churches completed in 1764
18th-century Episcopal church buildings
Churches on the National Register of Historic Places in South Carolina
Episcopal churches in South Carolina
Colonial South Carolina
English-American culture in South Carolina
Historic American Buildings Survey in South Carolina
National Register of Historic Places in Berkeley County, South Carolina
1764 establishments in South Carolina
Georgian architecture in South Carolina